Vivian Dowding (1892–1987) was a Canadian activist based in British Columbia who worked to improve birth control access for working class women. Representing the Parents' Information Bureau, and based in Kamloops, Dowding started travelling around the British Columbia's Southern Interior in 1937 to educate doctors about contraception and to help low-income women avoid unplanned pregnancy. Dowding operated in defiance of Canadian laws criminalizing birth control; birth control was not removed from the Canadian Criminal Code until 1969. Dowding was influenced by the work of Margaret Sanger and saw birth control access as a necessary step to women's liberation and to lifting low-income women out of poverty. She was an active member of Canada's Co-operative Commonwealth Federation and then Canada's New Democratic Party until her death in 1987.

Despite facing obstacles, such as being thrown out of doctor's offices and having her birth control supplies being held by disapproving postmasters, Dowding persisted in her feminist mission.

References 

1892 births
1987 deaths
People from Kamloops
20th-century Canadian women
Canadian women activists